myTV is an Arab American provider of Arabic live channels and video on demand in North and South America, Australia and New Zealand, using over-the-top technology.

History
myTV, an over-the-top content service provider with offices in Lebanon and the U.S., was founded on the June 15, 2011 by Lebanese expatriates living in the US. The concept was originally developed by SNA Corp. a leading provider of Digital Online Content services for multinational media companies. MyTV provides Arabic-language Live TV Channels and Video on Demand (VOD) everywhere in the Americas as well as Europe, Australia and New Zealand.

The myTV service helps expatriates and people-on-the-move feel closer to their homeland, by giving them access to the channels they love, and the TV shows, movies or music videos they miss, straight to their living room television set or mobile device. In response to the demand for quality television in Arabic, myTV secured exclusive deals with the most popular channels such as LBC America and Rotana.

Launch
myTV launched its services through an online campaign themed "Messages from Home" that began on January 30, 2012. The videos, composed of genuine messages gathered from Lebanese people across the country to their relatives abroad, were posted on Facebook, YouTube, Twitter and Pinterest; these social platforms made up the bulk of online tools used during the campaign.

Recognition
In March 2013, Communicate Levant, the Beirut-based sibling of market-leading Communicate magazine, one of the region's leading advertising, marketing and media resource, voted myTV as the number one startup for 2013.

Features

Live Channels
Channels currently available on myTV include
 LBC America
 LBC America Drama
 LBC America News
 Al Sumaria
 Rotana Khalijiah
 Rotana Masriya
 Al Jadeed
 Fann
 Safwa
 Roya TV
 Arab Woman TV
 Al-Resalah
 Iqraa
 Taha TV
 Iqraa Europe
 Iqraa America
 Iqraa Asia and Australia
 Rotana Cinema
 Cinema 1
 Cinema 2
 Rotana Aflam
 Rotana Classic
 Al Yawm
 Al Mousalsalat
 Rusiya Al-Yawm
 Sky News Arabia
 BBC Arabic
 ONTV
 Rotana Music
 Rotana Clip
 Music Now
 Karameesh

Video on Demand
myTV has an extensive Video on Demand library, consisting of Arabic movies, Arabic TV series, documentaries, cartoons and short films consisting of popular titles, such as the following:
 A collection of Youssef Chahine films.
 Lebanese classic TV series, such as Insa Hmoumak and El Denieh hek, as well as musical films by Lebanese singer Fairuz.
 Umm Kulthum and Abdel Halim Hafez concerts.
 Several works of the character Ghawwar el Tosheh (Duraid Lahham), such as Shaqaeq Al Noman, Day'et Tishrin, Hamam el Hana and Wein el Ghalat.
 Al Shahroura,  the Ramadan TV series that tells the story of Lebanese singer Sabah and explores her artistic and personal life. A biography acted out by pop star Carole Samaha
 As the Poet Said, a film that takes on a poetic approach to the life of the late Palestinian poet Mahmoud Darwish.
 Several historical series, telling the tales of Antarah ibn Shaddad and Khalid ibn al-Walid.
 Foreign Arabic-dubbed series, such as María la del Barrio, starring Thalía and Rosalinda
 A long list of anime cartoons dubbed (Arabic voice over) in Arabic, including Grendizer, Sally Captain Majid and Calimero
 A series of the interpretation of the Quran by Sheikh Sha'arawi
 A series of high-profile interviews with celebrities all over the world by renowned Lebanese host Ricardo Karam

Device support
As of 2013, myTV has become available on over 300 devices, which consist of set-top boxes, smart TVs and tablets.

Some of the devices include:

 Google TV devices Set-top boxes like Sony Internet Player TV as well as Android and Samsung tablets.
 Boxee Box set-top box
 Samsung Smart TV
 LG SMART TV (only 47G2 and 55G2 Models)
 WD TV Live
 Netgear Neo TV 300

See also
 Internet Television

References

External links

OTT

Mass media companies of the United Arab Emirates
Direct broadcast satellite services
Television technology
Video on demand services
Mass media companies established in 2011